Alderson is a locality in Alberta, Canada within Cypress County. Now a ghost town, it previously held village status until January 31, 1936, and was known as the Village of Carlstadt from 1911 to 1916. The name was changed during the First World War when many other settlements in Canada and Australia changed German place names.

History 
Settlers came to southeast Alberta during the great land rush of the early years of the 20th century. It was formerly a train whistle stop named Langevin and would go on to become the centre of one of Canada's worst agriculture disasters; victim of drought, fires, flies, grasshoppers and marauding rabbits.

Demographics 

In the 1931 Census, Alderson had a population of 81.

Further reading 
Empire of dust: Settling and abandoning the Prairie dry belt

See also 
List of communities in Alberta
List of former urban municipalities in Alberta
List of ghost towns in Alberta

References 

Former villages in Alberta
Ghost towns in Alberta
Localities in Cypress County
Populated places established in 1910